Ovacuma is a belde (town) in Safranbolu district of Karabük Province, Turkey. The town is situated in the mountainous area along a valley of a creek with the same name. The population of the town is 2006 as of 2010. The town was formed by merging seven neighbouring villages in 1998 and it is quite dispersed. The main economic activity of the town depends on forestry.

References

Populated places in Karabük Province
Towns in Turkey
Safranbolu District